Daniël Adrianus Augustinus "Daan" Schuurmans (born 24 January 1972) is a Dutch actor.
He is married to Dutch actress Bracha van Doesburgh and they have a daughter named Sophia and twins sons named Kees and Boris.

Career
Schuurmans began his career in 1996, when he played a role in Fort Alpha. After several other roles he landed in Westenwind. After his roles in both Costa! and the TV series with the same title he received national recognition and played roles in other national productions, including Volle maan, Phileine zegt sorry, Polleke, Pipo en de p-p-Parelridder, Snowfever and Floris.

In 2006, Schuurmans played in the TV series Keyzer & De Boer Advocaten.

Since 2014 he's been starring in the TV series Heer en Meester (Lord and Master) as Valentijn Bentinck, a charming millionaire who likes investigating crimes and has a mysterious past.

He is also recently starring in several Dutch theater productions.

In 2022 he was the presenter and narrator of the Dutch historical docudrama Het verhaal van Nederland.

Selected filmography

External links

References

1972 births
Living people
Dutch male actors
Actors from Rotterdam
Maastricht Academy of Dramatic Arts alumni
21st-century Dutch male actors